Özgür Sert (born 11 January 2001) is a Turkish professional footballer who plays as a leftback for Süper Lig club Kasımpaşa.

Professional career
Sert made his professional debut with BB Erzurumspor in a 4-1 Turkish Cup loss to Alanyaspor on 14 January 2021. He debuted in the Süper Lig in a 3–1 loss to Fenerbahçe, scoring his side's only goal in his debut.

References

External links
 
 

2001 births
Living people
Sportspeople from Erzurum
Turkish footballers
Süper Lig players
Büyükşehir Belediye Erzurumspor footballers
Association football fullbacks